The Guia Circuit, or Circuito da Guia, is a  street circuit located at the southeast region of the Macau Peninsula in Macau. It is the venue of the Macau Grand Prix and Guia Race of Macau. The circuit consists of long straights and tight corners, and features the characteristics of a typical street circuit - narrow, bumpy and limited overtaking opportunities. As a result, the circuit is recognised as one of the most challenging circuits in the world in terms of both driving and tuning, as cars have to maintain competitive speed to overcome hill-climbing, twisty corners and long straights in a single lap.

History

The Guia Circuit was originally conceived in 1954 as the route for a treasure hunt around the streets of the city, but shortly after the event it was suggested that the hunt's track could host an amateur racing event for local motor enthusiasts. Since 1967, with the introduction of a motorcycle race, the track has become a venue for both motorcycle and car racing events.

Racing events
The circuit is unique for its combination of motorcycle and car racing events within the same race weekend. The Macau Motorcycle GP, the Guia Race (WTCC final rounds from 2005 to 2014) and the Macau Formula 3 GP are the highlights of the race weekend. In addition, various kind of racing events are organised for competition between local and regional (Hong Kong, Taiwan, Japan, South East Asia, etc.) enthusiasts.

Layout

Unlike other regular racing tracks in the world, the layout of the Guia Circuit has not been modified since 1957 (the pit and paddock complex has been relocated to the present location since 1993, but the layout of the circuit has not been changed). The narrowest part of the track has a width of merely , which is located at the Melco Hairpin. The whole length of the circuit is safely bounded by Armco barriers painted in black and yellow stripes. There used to be a gravel trap near the Reservoir Bend but since the pit and paddock complex was moved to the present location, this feature has been removed.

Grandstands

There are two major grandstands around the circuit for spectators to watch live racing - the main grandstand along the pit straight and the other one at the Lisboa Bend. The Lisboa Bend is the most famous spot of excitement as it offers the only possible overtaking opportunity at the end of the main straight. On the other hand, it is also notorious for massive pile-ups on opening laps due to its 90-degree turn configuration and its significant reduction in track width. As a result, the ticket price for a seat at the Lisboa Bend is much higher than that of a seat at the main grandstand. But as with most street circuits there are many people who stand or sit next to the track or on bridges and fly overs.

Lap records
 

Italics indicate discontinued class. The fastest official race lap records at the Guia Circuit are listed as:

Appearances in video games

See also
 Macau Grand Prix
 Guia Race of Macau
 World Touring Car Championship

References

External links

Official site
Asian Festival of Speed results

Motorsport venues in Macau
Motorsport in Macau
Tourism in Macau
Macau Grand Prix
Sports venues in Macau
World Touring Car Championship circuits